The talking drum is an hourglass-shaped drum from West Africa, whose pitch can be regulated to mimic the tone and prosody of human speech. It has two drumheads connected by leather tension cords, which allow the player to change the pitch of the drum by scraping the cords between their arm and body.

In the 18th century, talking drum players used tones to disseminate messages, such as news of ceremonies and commands, over 4-5 mile distances.

A skilled player is able to play whole phrases. Most talking drums sound like a human humming depending on the way they are played. 

Similar hourglass-shaped drums are found in Asia, but they are not used to mimic conversation, although the idakka is used to mimic vocal music.

Five varieties of dùndún pressure drums of the Yoruba and the atumpan and fontomfrom of the Asante (Ashanti) are especially notable.

Names in West Africa

History
Hourglass-shaped talking drums are some of the oldest instruments used by West African  griots and their history can be traced back to the Bono people, Yoruba people, the Ghana Empire and the Hausa people. The Yoruba people of south western Nigeria and Benin and the Dagomba of northern Ghana have both developed a highly sophisticated genre of griot music centering on the talking drum. Many variants of the talking drums evolved, with most of them having the same construction mentioned above. Soon, many non-hourglass shapes showed up and were given special names, such as the Dunan, Sangban, Kenkeni, Fontomfrom and Ngoma drums. This construction is limited to within the contemporary borders of West Africa, with exceptions to this rule being northern Cameroon and western Chad; areas which have shared populations belonging to groups predominant in their bordering West African countries, such as the Kanuri, Djerma, Fulani and Hausa.

Serer people
In Senegalese and Gambian history, the tama (in the Serer language) was one of the music instruments used in the Serer people's "Woong" tradition (the "dance performed by Serer boys yet to be circumcised" or the future circumcised, also known as the "Xaat" (in Serer). The tama drum, has Serer religious connotations (which predates the Ghana Empire). In the Xaat tradition, the tama makes up the fourth musical drum ensemble. The Serer drums played include: Perngel, Lamb, Qiin and Tama.

From a historical perspective, the tama (just like the Serer junjung), was beaten by the griots of Senegambian kings on special occasions, such as during wars (a call for arms), when the kings wanted to address their subjects, and on special circumstances in Serer country – a call for martyrdom, such as the mayhem at Tahompa (a 19th-century surprise attack) and the Battle of Naoudourou, where the defeated Serers (by the Muslim-marabouts of Senegambia), committed suicide rather than be conquered by the Muslim forces or forced to submit to Islam.  Suicide is permitted in Serer religion only if it satisfies the Serer principle of Jom (see Serer religion).  The word "Jom" means "honour" in the Serer language.

Yoruba people

Ayangalu
Ayangalu is believed to have been the first Yoruba drummer. Upon his death he was deified, and so now he is counted among the ranks of the Orishas. It is believed by followers of the Yoruba religion that he is the patron spirit of all drummers, and that in the guise of a muse he inspires the drummers to play well. The word "Ayan" means drummer in the Yoruba language. This is why some Yoruba family names contain the prefix Ayan, such as Ayanbisi, Ayangbade, Ayantunde, Ayanwande etc. This prefix marks its bearers out as hereditary custodians of the mysteries of Ayangalu.

In the 20th century the talking drum became a part of popular music in West Africa. It is used in playing Mbalax music of Senegal and in Fuji and Jùjú music of Nigeria (where it is known as a dùndún, not to be confused with the dundun bass drum of the Mandé peoples). The talking drum is also used in ceremonial functions and events like weddings, burial ceremonies, private functions and most importantly it is commonly used by African bands as part of their musical instruments.

Mechanism of action 

The pitch of the drum is varied to mimic the tone patterns of speech.  This is done by varying the tension placed on the drumhead: the opposing drum heads are connected by a common tension cord.  The waist of the drum is held between the player's arm and ribs, so that when squeezed the drumhead is tightened, producing a higher note than when it is in its relaxed state; the pitch can be changed during a single beat, producing a warbling note.  The drum can thus capture the pitch, volume, and rhythm of human speech, though not the qualities of vowels or consonants.

The use of talking drums as a form of communication was noticed by Europeans in the first half of the 18th century. Detailed messages could be sent from one village to the next faster than could be carried by a person riding a horse. In the 19th century Roger T. Clarke, a missionary, realised that "the signals represent the tones of the syllables of conventional phrases of a traditional and highly poetic character." Many African languages are tonal; that is, the pitch is important in determining the meaning of a particular word. The Yoruba language, for instance, is mostly defined by the tri-tonic scale, consisting only of the tonic sol-fa notes, do, re, mi, different inflections of which are then used to convey different messages, the same principle also applies to how the drum talks in all of the Yoruba's music and culture. However, the Serer language and its relative Senegambian languages are not tonal, unlike almost all other Niger-Congo languages.

The problem was how to communicate complex messages without the use of vowels or consonants but simply using tone. An English emigrant to Africa, John F. Carrington, in his 1949 book The Talking Drums of Africa, explained how African drummers were able to communicate complex messages over vast distances. Using low tones referred to as male and higher female tones, the drummer communicates through the phrases and pauses, which can travel upwards of 4–5 miles. The process may take eight times longer than communicating a normal sentence but was effective for telling neighboring villages of possible attacks or ceremonies. He found that to each short word that was beaten on the drums, an extra phrase was added, which would be redundant in speech but provided context to the core drum signal.

Example 
The message "Come back home" might be translated by the drummers as: "Make your feet come back the way they went, make your legs come back the way they went, plant your feet and your legs below, in the village which belongs to us".

Single words would be translated into phrases. For example, "moon" would be played as "the Moon looks towards earth", and "war" as "war which causes attention to ambushes".

The extra phrases provide a context in which to make sense of the basic message or drum beats. These phrases could not be randomized, when learning to play the drum students were taught the particular phrase that coincided with each word. This reason alone made learning to talk in drum language very difficult and not many were willing to take the time to do so. The extra drum beats reduce the ambiguity of the meaning. Ironically, when the West understood the mechanism of the drums, they had already begun to be used less often in Africa. Also, words often lost their meaning. In an interview with Carrington, he explained that when words that are not used often, the phrases that correspond to them are forgotten. When given the beat for young girl, the drummers thought the phrase played was in fact the one for fishing nets.

As emphasized by Finnegan, the messages sent via drums were not confined to utilitarian messages. Drum languages could also be used for specifically literary forms, for proverbs, panegyrics, historical poems, dirges, and in some cultures practically any kind of poetry. The ritualized forms and drum names constituted a type of oral literature. Among some peoples such as the Ashanti or the Yoruba, drum language and literature were very highly developed. In these cultures, drumming tended to be a specialized and often hereditary activity, and expert drummers with a mastery of the accepted vocabulary of drum language and literature were often attached to a king's court.

Talking drum variance

Dimensions
Various sizes of hourglass talking drum exist, with the dimensions of the drum differing between ethnic groups, but all following the same template.

This produces a much higher pitched tone than other talking drums of the same construction.

In Yoruba talking-drum ensembles, this is used alongside smaller talking drums similar to the Tama, called Gangan in Yoruba language.

Playing styles

Playing styles are closely linked with the drum's construction and the tonal qualities of each language. There is a clear difference in playing styles between areas with predominantly Fulani and Mande-speaking populations and traditionally non-Mande areas further east.

The predominant style of playing in areas further west such as Senegal, Gambia, western Mali and Guinea is characterized by rapid rolls and short bursts of sound between the stick holding hand and accompanying free hand, and correlates with the various pitch accent and non-tonal languages heard in this area. This is a style typically heard in the popular Mbalax genre of Senegal.

From eastern Mali, Burkina Faso and Ghana, towards Niger, western-Chad and Nigeria, (with the exceptions of areas with Fulani and Mande-speaking majorities) the playing style of the talking drum is centered on producing long and sustained notes by hitting the drum head with the stick-holding hand and the accompanying free hand used to dampen and change tones immediately after being hit. This produces a rubbery sounding texture to its playing, which mimics the heavy and complex tones used in languages from this area (see Niger–Congo tonal language chart). This characteristic style can be clearly heard in the popular music of this area, particularly in those where the talking drum is the lead instrument, such as Fuji music of the Yoruba of Nigeria.

Use in popular music
King Crimson used the talking drum on its album Larks' Tongues in Aspic, for the track "The Talking Drum".  

Tom Waits used the talking drum on his song "Trouble's Braids," a track from the album Swordfishtrombones.

Erykah Badu used the talking drum on her song "My People", from the album New Amerykah Part One (4th World War).

Sikiru Adepoju is a master of the talking drum from Nigeria who has collaborated with artists from the Grateful Dead to Stevie Wonder and Carlos Santana.

Naná Vasconcelos, master of percussion, started playing the talking drum in the early 1980s and has used it ever since.

Mick Fleetwood of Fleetwood Mac has used the talking drum on the track "World Turning" on the band's 1975 eponymous album and in concert performances of the song.

David Byrne's American Utopia Broadway musical and HBO concert film features a tama player on multiple songs during the show.

In popular culture

In the game series Patapon, the player is a god who communicates with his or her followers using four Talking Drums. Each has its own unique sound: 'Pata,' 'Pon,' 'Don' and 'Chaka.'

In the television series Dead Like Me, the talking drum is discussed as a means of celebrating the lives of the dead.

They can also be heard in the 1959 movie The Nun's Story, starring Audrey Hepburn, when she arrives in what was at that time the Belgian Congo.

Bill Kreutzmann, a drummer for the Grateful Dead, occasionally played a talking drum at the band's live shows during the "drums" segment of their shows in the second set.

The talking drum features prominently in the score of the 2018 film Black Panther. The score, composed by Ludwig Göransson, uses talking drums at the core of a leitmotif associated with the film's protagonist, T'Challa (played by Chadwick Boseman).

Drum names
In some ethnic groups, each individual was given a drum name. Examples from among the Bulu of Cameroon are "Even if you dress up finely, love is the only thing" or "The giant wood rat has no child, the house rat has no child". Talking drum players sent messages by drumming the recipient's name, followed by the sender's name and the message.

See also
 Drum (communication)
 Whistling languages, tonal transpositions of spoken languages.

Notes

References
 Gravrand, Henry, "La civilisation seereer – Pangool, vol. 2, Les Nouvelles Editions Africaines du Senegal, 1990, pp. 40, 48–49, .
 Gravrand, Henry, "L'Heritage spirituel Sereer: Valeur traditionelle d'hier, d'aujourd'hui et de demain", in Ethiopiques, numéro 31, révue socialiste de culture négro-Africaine, 3e trimestre 1982  (retrieved 7 May 2012)
 Joof, Alhaji Alieu Ebrima Cham, "Senegambia, the land of our heritage" (1995)
 Sarr, Alioune, "Histoire du Sine-Saloum" (Sénégal), Introduction, bibliographie et notes par Charles Becker, Bulletin de l'Institut fondamental d'Afrique noire, Tome 46, Serie B, n° 3–4, 1986–1987, p. 42.
"Drum Telegraphy". TIME, 21 September 1942. Online version accessed 7 November 2006.

External links
Video of Senegalese talking drum, known as a Tama -"Male' and the talking drum from africa" (in) Youtube

Serer culture
Serer history
Senegalese culture
Gambian culture
Senegalese musical instruments
Ghanaian musical instruments
African drums
West African music
Ivorian musical instruments
Malian culture
Nigerian culture
Nigerien culture
Yoruba musical instruments
Drums
Speech-surrogate instruments